The Janamat Party is a Nepalese political party. The party stands as a national party in Nepal and is the seventh-largest party since the 2022 general election.

History

Formation 
Formerly known as Alliance for Independent Madhesh, it was formed by former secessionist leader C. K. Raut. It was formed after signing an 11-point agreement with the government of Nepal and resulted in ending his separatist movement with KP Oli. The party was formed on 18 March 2019 after a two-day conclave held on 17–18 March in front of 50 delegates representing 22 districts of Nepal's Terai region. A three-member committee headed by Chandan Singh was formed to implement the deal signed with the government. Aimed at expanding the party's strength, a 35-member central working committee was also formed under Raut's leadership.

Party expansion and 2022 elections 
The party underwent development of party organization centered mainly in Lumbini and Madhesh Province. Though the party couldn't get expected level of success, it was able to win two local levels of Saptari district which include Balan-bihul and Hanumannagar Kankalini Municipality which were previously won by Janata Samajwadi Party. Due to Janamat party, the vote bank of Janata Samajwadi Party was seen to have largely declined limiting the former largest party of Madhesh province to third position. Party won Hanumannagar Kankalini mayor defying son of provincial minister Nawal Kishor Sah, Shailesh Kumar Sah who was also the outgoing mayor.

The party won decisive seats in Madhesh provincial assembly. The party chair CK Raut won from Saptari 2 defying Upendra Yadav, the chairman of People's Socialist Party, Nepal. The party crossed 3% threshold limit to take the toll to 5 in Pratinidhi Sabha. The party chair and Congress senior leader Bimalendra Nidhi had positive talks regarding future government formation at national level and provincial assembly on 30 November 2022. During the talks, Raut cleared that he was a firm believer of democracy and was ready to join hands with Congress forming a democratic government.

List of Members of Parliament

Electoral performance

General election

Provincial election

Local election

Leadership

Chairman 

 CK Raut (2019–present)

General Secretary 

 Chandan Kumar Singh (2019–present)

See also 

 People's Socialist Party, Nepal 
 Nepali Congress, Madhesh Province 
 Loktantrik Samajwadi Party, Nepal 
 Terai Madhesh Loktantrik Party
 People's Progressive Party
 2022 Provincial Assembly of Madhesh Province election

References

Political parties in Nepal
2019 establishments in Nepal
Political parties established in 2019